This Time is the sixth studio album by rapper Beanie Sigel, it was released in the US on August 28, 2012.  In addition to being Sigel's last album before he reported to prison on September 12, 2012 to serve a two-year prison sentence for tax evasion, it was the first album released under the newly relaunched Ruffhouse Records following its own thirteen-year hiatus.

Guest appearances include Akon, The Game, Corey Latif Williams, Junior Reid, Young Chris, and Sigel's own group State Property.

Track listing 
Confirmed by Amazon

References

External links
Official album website

2012 albums
Beanie Sigel albums
Ruffhouse Records albums
EMI Records albums